Utica Community Schools (UCS) is a public school district located in Macomb County, Michigan in the Metropolitan Detroit area. UCS serves the city of Utica, the majority of Shelby Township, the northern portion of Sterling Heights, and parts of Ray, Washington, and Macomb townships in the U.S. state of Michigan.  UCS is the second-largest school district in the state of Michigan. Mr. Robert Monroe is the current superintendent of Utica Community Schools.  UCS provides education for 29,519 students in kindergarten through 12th grade.  There are presently 15,305 elementary students, 6,578 junior high students, and 7,636 senior high students.

Utica Community Schools operates 25 elementary schools, seven junior high school and four comprehensive high schools and one alternative education high school. In addition, the Instructional Resource Center and the Training and Development Center provide additional educational opportunities to the community.

Schools
High Schools
Adlai E. Stevenson High School
Dwight D. Eisenhower High School
Henry Ford II High School
Utica High School
Utica Alternative Learning Center

High School Specialty Programs
Gene L. Klida Utica Academy For International Studies
Stevenson MADE
Utica Center for Science and Industry
Utica Center for Mathematics, Science and Technology 

Junior High Schools
Bemis Junior High School
Davis Junior High School
Eppler Junior High School
Heritage Junior High School
Jeannette Junior High School
Malow Junior High School
Shelby Junior High School

Elementary Schools
Beck Elementary
Beacon Tree Elementary
Browning Elementary
Burr Elementary
Collins Elementary
Crissman Elementary
DeKeyser Elementary
Duncan Elementary
Dresden Elementary
Ebeling Elementary
Flickinger Elementary
Graebner Elementary
Harvey Elementary
Havel Elementary
Messmore Elementary
Monfort Elementary
Morgan Elementary
Oakbrook Elementary
Plumbrook Elementary
Roberts Elementary
[Schuchard Elementary] (Michigan)
Schwarzkoff Elementary
Switzer Elementary
West Utica Elementary
H.H Wiley Elementary

Transportation
Utica Community Schools employs 250 transportation personnel, and 12 district mechanics to service the school district's fleet of 250 district-owned school buses, as well as 75 other district-owned vehicles. The UCS Transportation Department is responsible for transporting students to and from school, as well as providing transportation for over 3,000 annual off-site learning experiences. Each day throughout the school year, some 21,000 students will ride on a Utica Community School's school bus. Like many other school districts in Metro Detroit, Utica Community Schools follows a dash numbering scheme on their school buses, which declares the year that the bus manufactured in. (For example, bus 481-02 was manufactured in 2002)

See also 
 Dean v. Utica

External links 
 

School districts in Michigan
Education in Macomb County, Michigan